Ayorinde is a surname. Notable people with the surname include: 

Deborah Ayorinde (born 1987), British-Nigerian actress
James Tanimola Ayorinde (1907-1970s), Nigerian minister
Sam Ayorinde (born 1974), Nigerian footballer
Steve Ayorinde (born 1970), Nigerian official

Surnames of Nigerian origin